Qadir Baksh Rind Baloch (1811 — November 1887) (famously known as Kadu Makrani) was a 19th-century Indian revolutionary who operated mainly in Kathiawar region of Gujarat but was born and raised in Makran. He is famously known for opposing and resisting British rule and rule by the upper class of Gujarat in favor of the rights of the poor lower class. He was one of the greatest freedom fighters of India.

Biography

Conflict with the British
Kadu Makrani migrated with his tribe from his birthplace Makran to Vadal near Junagadh in Gujarat. during the mid-19th century. Makrani and his tribe fought for territories and resources, receiving tribute from the rulers of Kathiawar princely states in return. This troubled the British colonial authorities, who sought to disarm his tribe; a justification was given when Makrani and his tribe rejected colonial government social workers entering their homes on the pretence of registration and census. Given the option of armistice or dissension, the tribe rebelled. Makrani's small army, with civilian support, engaged in conflict with the colonial military and made them suffer many casualties. The colonial military ultimately failed to capture Makrani's army, so they announced a bounty of Rs 1,000/- and a 20-acre (81,000 m2) land reward for his capture.

Return home

In October 1887, Makrani's companions suggested returning to Makran to avoid arrest by police in Kathiawar. Accepting the advice, Kadu Makrani along with the rest of his tribe moved to Ahmedabad and then Sindh. A camel-herder agreed to transport him to Makran, but he actually planned to betray him and then kill him in return for the bounty reward; However, when he attacked Makrani, he was overwhelmed by Makrani's superior sword fighting skills and Makrani eventually slew him and fled. Makrani was later captured unconscious after being hit and then knocked out by a falling stone due to a landslide in the Kirthar Mountains. After a short trial, he was sentenced to death.

Death
 
Makrani was executed at Karachi Central Jail in November 1887. He was buried at Mewah Shah Graveyard.

In popular culture
In 1960, Sadhana Chitra Film Company (India) made a Gujarati film titled "Kadu Makrani" to pay tribute to Makrani, directed by Manhar Rangildas Raskapur starring Arvind Ganpatram Pandya in the lead role of Makrani.

References

External Links
 

1811 births
1878 deaths
Baloch people
Executed Indian people
19th-century executions by British India
Year of birth unknown
People from Gujarat
People from Lyari Town
Burials at Mewa Shah Graveyard